Hassan Sharahili (born 24 February 1993) is a Saudi Arabian professional footballer who plays as a striker for Al-Arabi.

Career
On 30 June 2022, Sharahili joined First Division side Al-Arabi.

International
He made his debut for the Saudi Arabia national football team on 25 March 2019 in a friendly against Equatorial Guinea.

Honours
Damac
MS League runner-up: 2018–19

Al-Batin
MS League: 2019–20

References

External links
 
 

1993 births
Living people
People from Riyadh Province
Saudi Arabian footballers
Al-Dera'a FC players
Al Batin FC players
Damac FC players
Al-Jabalain FC players
Al-Arabi SC (Saudi Arabia) players
Saudi Professional League players
Saudi First Division League players
Saudi Fourth Division players
Saudi Arabia international footballers
Association football forwards